Ronald Anthony Smith (14 October 1944 – 19 October 2011) was a British boxer. He fought as Ronnie Smith and competed in the featherweight event at the 1964 Summer Olympics.

Smith won the 1964 Amateur Boxing Association British featherweight title, when boxing out of the Fisher ABC.

1964 Olympic results
Below is the record of Ronald smith, a British featherweight boxer who competed at the 1964 Tokyo Olympics:

 Round of 32: lost to Tim Tun (Burma) referee stopped contest

References

External links
 

1944 births
2011 deaths
Featherweight boxers
Olympic boxers of Great Britain
Boxers at the 1964 Summer Olympics
Boxers from Liverpool
English male boxers